Contrasimnia is a genus of sea snails, marine gastropod mollusks in the family Ovulidae.

Species
Species within the genus Contrasimnia include:

Contrasimnia formosana (Azuma, 1972)
Contrasimnia pagoda (Cate, 1973)
Contrasimnia xanthochila (Kuroda, 1928)

References

Ovulidae